Malans is a commune in the Doubs department in the Bourgogne-Franche-Comté region in eastern France.

Geography
Two streams pass through the commune: the Bietard and the Anchet.

The commune includes the villages of Saint Loup, Simorin, and Val Sainte Marie.

History
The history of the commune goes back to the monastery of Val Sainte Marie established in the 18th century. The monks eventually abandoned the monastery, but left numerous religious edifices and shrines.

Population

See also
 Communes of the Doubs department

References

External links

 Malans on the intercommunal Web site of the department 

Communes of Doubs